Varez is a surname. Notable people with the surname include:

Dietrich Varez (1939–2018), American printmaker-painter
E. F. Varez (1780–1866), French playwright and novelist

See also
Vare